Packmoor is a small village in Stoke-on-Trent near to Kidsgrove.

References

Villages in Staffordshire